Ekram may refer to:
 Ekram (film), an Indian film
 Ekram, a given name, variant of Ikram; notable people with the name include:
 Ekram Ali (born 1950), Indian poet 
 Ekram Hossain (born 1974), Canadian engineer
 Khaleda Ekram, Bangladeshi architect
 Ekramuddin Ahmad (1872-1940), Bengali litterateur

See also
Ekrem
ECRAM